Cape South or formerly known as Cape Silat is the southernmost point on the island of Kalimantan (also known as Borneo), at . Administratively it is part of South Kalimantan province of Indonesia. Once this whole region was a swamp, but the land area north of the cape is being cleared for rubber plantations and grazing for cattle. The sediment along the coast is from the Barito River to the north and from small streams near the tip of the cape where land has been cleared. The forested hills of the southern Besar Range are visible along the south-eastern coast midway between the upper center and upper right of the image.

Selatan
South Kalimantan